The men's 200 metres at the 1954 European Athletics Championships was held in Bern, Switzerland, at Stadion Neufeld on 28 and 29 August 1954.

Medalists

Results

Final
29 August

Semi-finals
28 August

Semi-final 1

Semi-final 2

Heats
28 August

Heat 1

Heat 2

Heat 3

Heat 4

Heat 5

Heat 6

Participation
According to an unofficial count, 30 athletes from 18 countries participated in the event.

 (1)
 (2)
 (2)
 (1)
 (2)
 (1)
 (1)
 (1)
 (2)
 (1)
 (2)
 (2)
 (2)
 (2)
 (2)
 (2)
 (2)
 (2)

References

200 metres
200 metres at the European Athletics Championships